Joe Dixon (born 10 October 1965) is an English actor who is perhaps best known for his role as Jacques in The Mummy Returns.

Biography
Dixon was born in Birmingham, Warwickshire in 1965 to Jamaican parents. He won the prestigious Ian Charleson Award for his 1991 performance as Jacques in Cheek by Jowls' all-male production of As You Like It, and was nominated for an Olivier Award for Best Performance in a Supporting Role for his 2003 performance in The Roman Actor at the Gielgud Theatre (Royal Shakespeare Company). He has 2 children - Zachary and Coco Rose - with his ex-fiancée Anna Jacobs.

He began acting at Castle Vale Comprehensive, where the drama teacher encouraged him to join the Birmingham Youth Theatre with his contemporary, Barry Aird. Dixon graduated from the Royal Academy of Dramatic Art and Castle Vale Comprehensive (now Greenwood Academy). He also has extensive performances in film and television. A professional tenor, Joe Dixon sang the lead role in The Bacchae opera at Queen Elizabeth Hall, and was in the top ten in Denmark, Spain, and Russia for backing vocals. He excels in playing the euphonium, guitar, tuba, and piano.

Filmography

References

External links

1965 births
Living people
Alumni of RADA
Black British male actors
English male film actors
English male television actors
English people of Guyanese descent
Ian Charleson Award winners
Male actors from Birmingham, West Midlands